Sensitive to a Smile is a 1987 album by New Zealand reggae band Herbs. It reached number 10 and spent 30 weeks in the New Zealand album chart and was awarded Album of the Year at the 1987 New Zealand Music Awards. The album included the four singles "Sensitive to a Smile", "Rust In Dust",  "Listen" and "No Nukes (The Second Letter)", all of which charted. Sensitive to a Smile was re-released digitally in 2012 with extra tracks from Herbs' 1984 album Long Ago and their 1982 single "French Letter (A Letter To France)".

The album was launched at Mangahanea marae in Ruatoria, as a gesture of unity to Ruatoria after it had seen conflict between local Rastafarian groups and the community, as well as arson attacks. The launch concert was filmed by director Lee Tamahori and became the basis of the music video for the first single "Sensitive to a Smile".

Fred Faleauto and Dilworth Karaka first recorded a version of "E Papa" with the Pātea Māori Club who released it as a reggae pop single in 1985. The song is a traditional composition sung during tītī tōrea (stick games).

Track listing

Personnel 

 Fred Faleauto – drums/vocals
 Dilworth Karaka – guitar/vocals
 Morrie Watene – sax/vocals
 Willie Hona – guitar/vocals
 Tama Lundon – keyboards/vocals
 Charles Tumahai – bass/vocals
 Thom Nepia – percussion/vocals
 Billy Kristian – producer
 Victor Grbic – engineer
 Hugh Harawira Lynn – executive producer

Awards 

|-
| 1987
| Sensitive to a Smile
| 1987 New Zealand Music Awards – Album of the Year
|  
|-
| 1987
| Billy Kristian for Sensitive to a Smile
| 1987 New Zealand Music Awards – Best Producer
|  
|-
|}

Charts

Weekly charts

Year-end charts

References

External links 
 Glen Moffatt's Sensitive to a Smile page
 Sensitive to a Smile at Discogs

1987 albums
Herbs (band) albums